Jersey Airport  is an international airport located in the parish of Saint Peter,  west northwest of Saint Helier in Jersey, in the Channel Islands.

History
Air service to Jersey before 1937 consisted of biplane airliners and some seaplanes landing on the beach at Saint Aubin's bay. Jersey Airways and Imperial Airways were among those who operated to the island before the Second World War, but conditions were difficult as tides governed timetables. It was also difficult to prevent public members from walking across the landing area, and any aircraft that had mechanical problems had to be dragged up the slipways until the tide receded.

In early March 1940 the Admiralty took over Jersey airport, to use as a Naval Air Station, known as RNAS Jersey. 755 Naval Air Squadron, a Telegraphist Air Gunner Training Squadron and 763 Naval Air Squadron, Torpedo, Spotter, Reconnaissance Pool No.1 arrived on 11 March 1940. On 21 May 1940, 826 Naval Air Squadron arrived for one weeks operation, departing on 29 May. However, due to the German occupation of France and the proximity to the Channel Islands, the Government concluded the Islands weren't defendable and both 755 NAS and 763 NAS were withdrawn on 31 May 1940 with RNAS Jersey closing on the same day. 816 Naval Air Squadron briefly used Jersey Airport between 6 and 11 June 1940, however, on 1 July 1940 the Island was occupied by German forces.

Concrete taxiways were added during the World War II occupation by the Luftwaffe – they also built hangars, one of which, the Jersey Airlines hangar, is still in existence although no longer used. A  tarmac runway was opened in 1952 and the grass strips were closed. A feature of the airport in the 1950s was the traffic control system – traffic-lights were in place to prevent vehicles using the road from Les Quennevais to the Airport when planes were being moved to or from the hangar used by B.E.A.

Additional taxiways were added several years later to improve access to the one end of the runway. Due to its restricted length, in October 2007 Thomsonfly announced the removal of some services as it introduced the larger Boeing 737-800 to its fleet. Designated 09/27 in 1952, the runway was redesignated 08/26 in October 2014 due to a shift in the earth's magnetic poles.

In March 2012, led by a Group Chief Executive, the successful completion of an integration programme with Jersey Harbours saw the creation of Ports of Jersey. The States of Jersey passed a business case in early-2015 and the companies were joined on 1 October 2015.

There were approximately 47,000 aircraft movements and 1,600,000 passengers at the airport during 2016.

Terminal
The 1937 terminal was designed with a control tower between the arrivals and departures areas. The terminal was extended in 1976. A new departures terminal adjoining the existing terminal was opened in 1997. A new air traffic control tower was completed and opened in late-2010, and all major airport operations have been transferred to these new buildings.

Work was intended to begin late-2011 to demolish the original airport building, constructed in 1937 and which contains large quantities of asbestos but work was never undertaken as the building was nominated as a protected historical building. On 17 March 2014 it was determined that the old terminal building would have to be demolished on grounds of aviation safety, but this was later reconsidered and in 2021 it was confirmed that the building would not be demolished.

Jersey is part of the Common Travel Area, which means that there are limited identity card checks before boarding a flight to the UK or the Republic of Ireland. There would be full passport check when travelling to or from other countries, however.

Airlines and destinations

The following airlines operate regular scheduled and charter flights to and from Jersey:

General aviation

Apart from scheduled airline services, Jersey Airport accommodates a thriving general aviation population, including the Jersey Aero Club. It is also home to the Jersey International Air Display in September each year. Both Isle-Fly and Gama Aviation are based at Jersey Airport and offer worldwide private charter flights.

Statistics

Ground transport

Road
There are long and short-stay car parks located at the airport, and free parking areas for bicycles and motorcycles. There are also many Car Hire companies, with desks located in the Arrivals Hall.

The airport connects to the road network via a roundabout onto L'Avenue de la Reine Elizabeth II and L'Avenue de la Commune.

Public transport
There is a public taxi rank, and bus stop directly outside the arrivals hall. LibertyBus route 15 is the main service between the Airport and the main bus station, Liberation Station in St Helier. - it runs every 15 minutes (20 on Sundays). Additionally, hourly route 9 between St Helier and La Grève de Lecq calls at the airport as does seasonal route 22 between St Helier and l'Etacq, also hourly.

Accidents and incidents

1938 Jersey Airport disaster

References

External links 

 

Airports in the Channel Islands
Aviation in Jersey
Tourism in Jersey
Buildings and structures in Jersey
Airports established in 1937
1937 establishments in Jersey